Wang Ziwen (born 28 February 1987), also known by her English name Olivia Wang and now as Ava Wang, is a Chinese actress. She is most known for portraying Qu Xiaoxiao in the popular Chinese television drama Ode to Joy and as Xuxu in When a Snail Falls in Love.

Wang ranked 87th on Forbes China Celebrity 100 list.

Filmography

Film

Television series

Discography

Singles

Awards and nominations

References

External links

Living people
1987 births
Actresses from Sichuan
21st-century Chinese actresses
Chinese film actresses
Chinese television actresses
Central Academy of Drama alumni